The L'Envol des pionniers (English: The Flight of the Pioneers), is a French aerospace museum which retraces the great adventure of Aéropostale and contributes to the memory of aeronautics in Toulouse. It is located in the Montaudran district and has been inaugurated on 22 December 2018, almost 100 years to the day after the inaugural flight of the first civilian flight to Barcelona.

History 
Located on the runway of the former Toulouse-Montaudran airport, it is part of the Toulouse Aerospace La Piste des Géants project, intended to showcase the glory days of Aéropostale and the Halle de La Machine. The beginnings were difficult for the museum, which owes its existence only to the tenacity of associations whose request succeeded after twenty years of struggle.

Collections 
In particular, it allows you to discover the equipment available to pilots such as Jean Mermoz, Henri Guillaumet and Antoine de Saint-Exupéry during the epic of l'Aéropostale and the Latécoère lines.

See also 

 List of aerospace museums
 List of museums in France

References

External links 

  

Museums in Haute-Garonne
Aerospace museums in France
National museums of France
Museums established in 2018
2018 establishments in France
Toulouse